General Sten Bengt Gustaf Gustafsson (2 December 1933 – 15 March 2019) was a Swedish Army officer. He served as the Supreme Commander of the Swedish Armed Forces from 1986 to 1994.

Early life
Gustafsson was born on 2 December 1933 in Hästveda, Sweden, the son of Gustav Svensson, a radio technician, and his wife Frida (née Lundell). Gustafsson's early interests included football, handball, chess and bridge, running and high jump. In the primary school (folkskola), he did not like the teacher very well, but in the secondary school (realskola) it went better, but the adaptation was not quite good, as there was some teachers he found it hard to get along with. Gustafsson also had difficulty in being quiet at the lessons.

Gustafsson graduated without any detention in the spring of 1950 with passed grades. Then he worked at a gas station until Christmas 1950, after which he quit there because it was too cold and badly paid. Gustafsson then worked at a social insurance agency with registers and such but thought it was monotonous. For many years, he had thought to become a pilot, preferably officer, otherwise in the commercial aviation. He'd otherwise thought of a possible engineering education. Gustafsson studied at the education company Hermods AB, courses in practical mathematics, aerodynamics, aeronautics, airplane engines and materials.

Career
The characteristic statements made about Gustafsson dated 7 March 1951 read; "his general intelligence as a whole, barely above average, as well as technical understanding and flight orientation, while the engine test gives a score above average. The review in social and psychological issues about normal for the age. Also maturation is about average, medium energy resources and reasonably able to organize them. Emotional life a little immature and not very nuanced, largely stable. Initiative mediocre, the ability to moderate endurance. Reliability and responsibility are not yet fully mature, but probably acceptable. Deficiencies in any adaptation, has little difficulty with self-discipline."

Gustafsson started his military career as a sergeant pilot. Gustafsson was admitted to the training but did not quite manage the flight itself. Gustafsson's assessment in the air dated 27 July 1951 read; "Poor sense of speed. Immature, forgetful, sloppy. Poor attention distribution. Poor mental activity in the air." and on the ground "Good ability, initiative and energetic. Calm and sensible. Reliable. Intelligent." 40 years later, as general and Supreme Commander, Gustafsson commented the characteristic statement "which shows, which eventually becomes a life experience, that it takes a long time, individually different long time, to be reasonably complete as an adult. In a jokeful manner you might say that it soon turned out that I fitted best on the ground when comparing ratings from air and ground teachers." He attended the Royal Swedish Army Staff College in 1959 and became an officer in Boden Engineer Corps (Ing 3). Gustafsson was promoted to lieutenant in 1961 and attended the Military Academy in 1966 and was promoted to captain the following year. He was the General Staff Officer in the Army Staff and the Defence Staff from 1966 to 1979 and was Director at the Swedish Civil Defence Board from 1970 to 1973.

Gustafsson attended the National Defence College in 1971 and 1982. He was promoted to major in 1972, to lieutenant colonel in 1974 and to lieutenant colonel with special position held in 1975. Gustafsson was appointed battalion commander at Älvsborg Regiment (I 15) in 1979 and was promoted to colonel and was appointed regimental commander of Svea Engineer Regiment (Ing 1) in 1981. He was promoted to senior colonel in 1982 and was appointed Permanent Secretary in the Ministry of Defence, a position he stayed in until 1984. Gustafsson was promoted directly from senior colonel to lieutenant general, passed major general, when he was appointed military commander of the Upper Norrland Military District (Milo ÖN) from 1 October 1984. He served there for two years. He was promoted to general and assumed the post of Supreme Commander in 1986. Gustafsson's term as Supreme Commander was marked initially by continued submarine hunts, but came increasingly to be about the fall of the Berlin Wall and the dissolution of the Warsaw Pact. Although the effects both for the world and for the Swedish defense policy became even clearer for the next Supreme Commander. In 1992, his appointment as Supreme Commander was extended to 1 July 1994, when he retired.

Gustafsson became a member of the Royal Swedish Academy of War Sciences in 1979. In 1990, Gustafsson became an honorary member of the Royal Swedish Society of Naval Sciences, but he left in 2004. Gustafsson became a board member of the General Defense Association (Allmänna försvarsföreningen) in 1982, of Swedair in 1983 and the National Swedish Board of Voluntary Military Training (Överstyrelsen för frivillig befälsutbildning) in 1984.

Personal life
In 1957 he married Inger Gustafsson. They had three children, one son and two daughters.

Death
Gustafsson died in his home on 15 March 2019. The funeral was held at Hedvig Eleonora Church in Stockholm on 5 April 2019.

Dates of rank

Awards and decorations

Swedish
  H. M. The King's Medal, 12th size gold medal with chain (1992)
  Swedish Air Force Volunteers Association Medal of Merit in gold (1994)

Foreign
  1st Class of the Order of the Cross of the Eagle (2 February 2005)

Bibliography

Footnotes

References

External links

1933 births
2019 deaths
Swedish Army generals
People from Hässleholm Municipality
Members of the Royal Swedish Academy of War Sciences
Members of the Royal Swedish Society of Naval Sciences
20th-century Swedish military personnel